Lal Dharmapriya Gamage (born 9 February 1954) was a Sri Lankan politician and the former Minister Assisting Foreign Affairs.

He is an architect by profession and was educated at Nalanda College Colombo.*

Gamage was elected to parliament at the 9th parliamentary election, held on 15 February 1989, as the United National Party representative, in the Anuradhapura electorate.

See also
List of political families in Sri Lanka

References

1954 births
Alumni of Nalanda College, Colombo
Living people
Members of the 9th Parliament of Sri Lanka
Sinhalese architects
Sinhalese politicians
Sri Lankan Buddhists
United National Party politicians
20th-century Sri Lankan architects
21st-century Sri Lankan architects